Pygospila is a genus of moths of the family Crambidae described by Achille Guenée in 1854.

Species
Pygospila bivittalis Walker, 1866
Pygospila costiflexalis Guenée, 1854
Pygospila cuprealis Swinhoe, 1892
Pygospila hyalotypa Turner, 1908
Pygospila imperialis Kenrick, 1907
Pygospila macrogastra Meyrick, 1936
Pygospila marginalis Kenrick, 1907
Pygospila minoralis Caradja in Caradja & Meyrick, 1937
Pygospila tyres (Cramer, 1779)
Pygospila yuennanensis Caradja in Caradja & Meyrick, 1937

References

Spilomelinae
Crambidae genera
Taxa named by Achille Guenée